The Kayin State Cultural Museum  is a museum in Hpa-an, Kayin State in Burma that displays figurines of Kayin national races, ivory, musical instruments, Buddha's images, household utensils, looms, lacquer wares and literature of the Kayin races.

The museum was established in November 1992. Admission fees is $2.

References

 Ministry of culture

Museums in Myanmar
Kayin State
Museums established in 1992